This list of tunnels in Nepal includes any road and waterway tunnels.

List

See also
List of tunnels by location

References

Nepal
 
Tunnels
Tunnels